Maurizio Rossi (born 20 December 1962) is an Italian former road cyclist, who competed as a professional from 1984 to 1990.

Career
Rossi almost won the 1986 Tour of the Basque Country, after winning the first stage in a solo victory 3:40 ahead of the peloton. He held the lead all the way to the last stage, which was an eighteen-kilometer individual time trial. Irish cyclist Sean Kelly finished the time trial 3:58 ahead of Rossi, therefore taking the final victory by eighteen seconds over Rossi, who still managed to finish second.

During his career, Rossi also won the Giro del Veneto in 1986 as well as the overall classification and a stage of the 1987 Settimana Internazionale di Coppi e Bartali.

Major results

1983
 1st Trofeo Papà Cervi
1985
 7th Giro di Toscana
1986
 1st Giro del Veneto
 2nd Overall Tour of the Basque Country
1st Stage 1
 5th Giro del Lazio
 7th Coppa Sabatini
1987
 1st Overall Settimana Internazionale di Coppi e Bartali
1st Stage 2
 2nd Giro di Campania
1989
 3rd Gran Premio Industria e Commercio di Prato

Grand Tour general classification results timeline

References

External links

1962 births
Living people
Italian male cyclists
People from Forlì
Cyclists from Emilia-Romagna
Sportspeople from the Province of Forlì-Cesena